Michelle Doris Thomas (September 23, 1968 – December 23, 1998) was an American actress. She was known for her roles as Justine Phillips on the NBC sitcom The Cosby Show (1988–90), as Myra Monkhouse on the ABC/CBS sitcom Family Matters (1993–98), and as Callie Rogers on the CBS soap opera The Young and the Restless (1998).

Early life and education
Michelle Thomas was born in Brookline, Massachusetts, on September 23, 1968, to Phynjuar "Penwah" Thomas, a stage actress, and musician father Dennis "Dee Tee" Thomas, a saxophonist and founding member of the band Kool & the Gang. Thomas grew up in Montclair, New Jersey, and graduated from West Essex High School in 1987.

As a child, she would accompany her mother at her theater rehearsals and performances. Her mother was her first acting coach, and coached her throughout the course of her career. A friend of her mother who had heard Michelle Thomas sing before had requested that she enter Miss Talented Teens. Thomas was crowned Miss Talented Teen New Jersey at the state's Hal Jackson's Talented Teen pageant, and then in July 1984, at the age of 15, she was crowned Miss Talented Teen International in Montego Bay, Jamaica from among 35 state and national representatives.

Career
In 1983, Michelle Thomas appeared in her first television commercial. In December 1984, she appeared with Hal Jackson on Soul Train after having won the Miss Talented Teen International pageant earlier in the year.

From 1988 to 1990, Thomas portrayed Justine Phillips, the girlfriend of Theo Huxtable, on The Cosby Show. She appeared on various television programs, including A Man Called Hawk in 1989 and Thea in 1994. Thomas had a role in Dream Date in 1989 and had a small role in Hangin' with the Homeboys in 1991.

Thomas appeared in music videos for Mint Condition, Chubb Rock, and Dru Hill. Her publicist was Kahdijah Bell, daughter of Ronald Bell of Kool & the Gang. Thomas was a guest host of the weekly music series Soul Train in May 1996 and March 1997.

From 1993 to 1998, she portrayed the role of Myra Monkhouse, the girlfriend of Steve Urkel, on Family Matters. After the sitcom ended in 1998, Thomas portrayed Callie Rogers, an aspiring singer and love interest of Malcolm Winters, on the daytime soap The Young and the Restless. In October 1998, Thomas took a medical leave from the series due to her ill health. Thomas had been in the studio recording music before her sudden turn in health. She appeared posthumously in the role of Anne in the film Unbowed in 1999.

Health and death

In August 1997, Thomas was diagnosed with a rare cancer, an intra-abdominal desmoplastic small-round-cell tumor (DSRCT). Thomas never smoked or drank alcohol, and was a vegetarian. Her mother added that "they'd give her a sedation that was supposed to put her out for 20 minutes and she'd be asleep for four days. Her body couldn't take it." Thomas underwent surgery to remove a lemon-sized tumor shortly before landing her The Young and the Restless role in the spring of 1998. She underwent surgery again in October 1998 after a second cancerous growth ruptured. After being released from the hospital, Thomas flew home to New Jersey to spend Thanksgiving with her family in Weehawken, New Jersey.

On December 23, at age 30, Thomas died in New York City at Manhattan's Memorial Sloan-Kettering Cancer Center. Malcolm-Jamal Warner, Thomas' longtime friend and former boyfriend, was among those at her bedside. On December 26, 1998, a Muslim funeral service was held, per her request. She was buried in New Jersey.

Filmography

Film

Television

Music videos

Honors

References

External links
 
 

1968 births
1998 deaths
20th-century American actresses
20th-century American comedians
Actresses from New Jersey
African-American actresses
African-American Muslims
American film actresses
American soap opera actresses
American television actresses
American women comedians
Burials at Rosedale Cemetery (Orange, New Jersey)
Deaths from cancer in New York (state)
Deaths from stomach cancer
People from Essex County, New Jersey
People from Montclair, New Jersey
West Essex High School alumni
20th-century African-American women
20th-century African-American people